Atractocerus is a genus of beetles in the family Lymexylidae. The most recent revision of the family treats several small or monotypic genera as synonyms of Atractocerus, though some authors continue to use the older generic names (e.g.).

Species 

 Atractocerus aspoecki (Paulus, 2004)
 Atractocerus ater Kraatz, 1895
 Atractocerus atricollis Pic, 1955
 Atractocerus bicolor Strohmeyer, 1910
 Atractocerus bifasciatus Gestro, 1874
 Atractocerus blairi Gardner, 1936
 Atractocerus brasiliensis Lepeletier & Audinet-Serville, 1825
 Atractocerus brevicornis (Linnaeus, 1766)
 Atractocerus bruijnii Gestro, 1874
 Atractocerus crassicornis Clark, 1931
 Atractocerus emarginatus Laporte de Castelnau, 1836
 Atractocerus gracilicornis Schenkling, 1914
 Atractocerus kreuslerae Pascoe, 1864
 Atractocerus monticola Kurosawa, 1985
 Atractocerus morio Pascoe, 1860
 Atractocerus niger Strohmeyer, 1910
 Atractocerus nipponicus Nakane, 1985
 Atractocerus procerus Schenkling, 1914
 Atractocerus quercus Gardner, 1935
 Atractocerus reversus Walker, 1858
 Atractocerus siebersi Karny, 1922
 Atractocerus tasmaniensis Lea, 1917
 Atractocerus termiticola Wasmann, 1902
 Atractocerus tonkineus Pic, 1948
 Atractocerus valdivianus (Philippi, 1866)
 Atractocerus victoriensis Blackburn, 1891

References

External links

Cucujoidea genera
Lymexylidae